María Rosa may refer to:
 Maria Rosa (1916 film), a 1916 silent drama film directed by Cecil B. DeMille
 María Rosa (1946 film), a 1946 Argentine film
 María Rosa, búscame una esposa, a Peruvian telenovela
 María Jesús Rosa (born 1979), Spanish field hockey player